The 2017 Greek Cup Final was the 73rd final of the Greek Football Cup. It took place on 6 May 2017 at Panthessaliko Stadium, between PAOK and AEK Athens. It was PAOK's eighteenth Greek Cup Final in their 91 years of existence and AEK Athens' twenty second Greek Cup Final and second consecutive, of their 93-year history. The HFF announcement for the 2016–17 Greek Cup mentioned the Olympic Stadium as the host for the final, but PAOK had clarified that they did not want to play at AEK Athens' home stadium, suggesting the Pankritio Stadium, however, the Federation chose the Panthessaliko Stadium. It was a stadium that until the completion of the semi-finals, did not actually exist on the table. The people of Thessaly Football Clubs Association quickly made the decision to submit a file after the qualification of PAOK to the final. In fact, within two hours, they tilted the plate in favor of conducting the game in their area, submitting a complete file. So it was decided that the final would take place at Volos with fans of both clubs and special constructions for the security in the conduction of the match. However, the match was marked by incidents between the fans of both clubs in the streets, inside and outside the stadium, where also was an invasion on the pitch by PAOK fans before the beginning of the match which resulted in punishment on both clubs for the next season.

Venue

This was the second Greek Cup Final held at the Panthessaliko Stadium after the 2007 final.

The Panthessaliko Stadium was built in 2004. The stadium is used as a venue for Niki Volos and Volos. Its current capacity is 22,700.

Background
PAOK had reached the Greek Cup Final seventeen times, winning four of them. The last time that they had won the Cup was in 2003 (1–0 against Aris). The last time that had played in a Final was in 2014, where they had lost to Panathinaikos by 4–1.

AEK Athens had reached the Greek Cup Final twenty one times, winning fourteen of them. The last time that had played in a Final was in 2016, where they had won Olympiacos by 2–1.

Route to the final

Match

Details

References

2017
Cup Final
Greek Cup Final 2017
Greek Cup Final 2017
Sport in Volos
May 2017 sports events in Europe